Olivia Troye is an American national security official who worked on national security and homeland security issues at the National Counterterrorism Center, the United States Department of Energy Office of Intelligence and Counterintelligence, and the DHS Office of Intelligence and Analysis. She went on to work in the Office of the Vice President of the United States as the Homeland Security and Counterterrorism advisor to Vice President Mike Pence and also served on the White House Coronavirus Task Force as Pence's lead staffer on the Task Force. She resigned from the White House in August 2020.

Early life and education 
Originally from El Paso, Texas, Troye is fluent in Spanish. She graduated from University of Pennsylvania, the National Defense University College of International Affairs, and the Naval Postgraduate School.

Career 
After graduating from college, Troye worked for the Republican National Committee. She began a career in national security after the September 11 attacks. She served in the Pentagon as a George W. Bush Administration appointee. Troye was an intelligence official in the DHS Office of Intelligence and Analysis serving as chief of strategy, policy, and plans. Troye worked in the Office of the Vice President of the United States as the homeland security and counterterrorism advisor to Vice President Pence and served as an aide to the White House Coronavirus Task Force.

While Troye says she resigned, Mike Pence's national security adviser, Keith Kellogg, claims he fired her and "escorted her off the compound." He has also more generally accused her of lying about her time in the Trump-Pence administration. Troye has denied the allegations. 

After leaving the White House, Troye became an outspoken critic against the Trump Administration’s response on the COVID-19 pandemic. She later publicly supported Joe Biden for the 2020 United States presidential election. Troye endorsed Biden in a video released by Republican Voters Against Trump.

In the wake of the collapse of the Afghan government and the fall of Kabul in August 2021, Troye called attention to deliberate obstruction of the visa process during the Trump Administration, especially by Stephen Miller, for Afghans who were partners with U.S. efforts in Afghanistan.  

In August 2020, Troye joined the National Insurance Crime Bureau as vice president of strategy, policy, and plans. Troye is also an advisor to Defending Democracy Together, a conservative, anti-Donald Trump political group known for the "Republicans for the Rule of Law" initiative.

In 2020, Troye, along with over 130 other former Republican national security officials, signed a statement that asserted that President Trump was unfit to serve another term, and "To that end, we are firmly convinced that it is in the best interest of our nation that Vice President Joe Biden be elected as the next President of the United States, and we will vote for him."

Personal life 
According to CNN, Troye is a lifelong Republican. She described herself as a "John McCain Republican" in a video released by Republican Voters Against Trump.

See also 

 List of former Trump administration officials who endorsed Joe Biden.

References

External links
 

1976 births
Living people
People from El Paso, Texas
University of Pennsylvania alumni
National Defense University alumni
Naval Postgraduate School alumni
Women government officials
Trump administration personnel
George W. Bush administration personnel
United States Department of Homeland Security officials
Criticism of Donald Trump